The 2006–07 SEB Korvpalli Meistriliiga was the 16th season of the Estonian basketball league and the third under the title sponsorship of SEB. Including the competition's previous incarnations, this was the 82nd season of the Estonian men's basketball league. Tallinna Kalev/Cramo came into the season as defending champions of the 2005–06 KML season.

The season started on 4 October 2006 and concluded on 29 May 2007 with TÜ/Rock defeating Tallinna Kalev/Cramo 4 games to 2 in the 2007 KML Finals to win their 23rd Estonian League title.

Regular season

League table

Updated to match(es) played on 29 May 2007. Source: KML (2006/2007)

Playoffs
The playoffs began on 11 April 2007 and ended on 29 May 2007. The tournament concluded with TÜ/Rock defeating Tallinna Kalev/Cramo 4 games to 2 in the 2007 KML Finals.

Bracket

References

External links
 Korvpalli Meistriliiga

Korvpalli Meistriliiga seasons
Estonian
KML